James Joseph Kane (November 27, 1881 – October 2, 1947) was a professional baseball player who played first base for the Pittsburgh Pirates in the 1908 Major Leagues.

External links

1881 births
1947 deaths
Major League Baseball first basemen
Baseball players from Pennsylvania
Sportspeople from Scranton, Pennsylvania
Pittsburgh Pirates players
Omaha Rourkes players
Sioux City Indians players